The city of Ottawa, Canada held municipal elections on November 12, 1985.

Riverside Ward alderman Jim Durrell defeated Britannia Ward alderman Marlene Catterall to become the new mayor of Ottawa.

Mayor

City council

Ottawa Board of Education Trustees
Two to be elected in each zone

Four to be elected 

One to be elected

References
Ottawa Citizen, November 13, 1985

Municipal elections in Ottawa
Ottawa municipal election
Municipal election, 1985
Ottawa municipal election